Vincent Dieutre (born 25 November 1960 in Le Petit-Quevilly) is a French film director and screenwriter. His films are primarily in the genre of docudrama, blending aspects of both documentary film and fiction.

He is openly gay.

Films
Rome désolée (1995)
Leçons de ténèbres (2000). Jury prize at the Marseille Festival of Documentary Film.
Entering Difference (Lettre de Chicago) (2000)
Bonne Nouvelle (2001). Jury prize at the Locarno International Film Festival.
Mon voyage d'hiver (2003)
Bologna Centrale (2003)
Les accords d'Alba (2004)
Fragments sur la grâce (2006)
 Une larme d'amour (2007)
 Conversations avec Yaël André (2008)
 ea2, 2e exercice d'admiration : Jean Eustache (2010)
 Beirut Hotel (2011)
 Jaurès (2012)

References

External links
 

1960 births
Living people
French film directors
French male screenwriters
French screenwriters
People from Le Petit-Quevilly
French gay writers
LGBT film directors
French LGBT screenwriters